The  is a member of the Cabinet of Japan and is the presiding officer of the National Public Safety Commission, which is the parent agency of the National Police Agency. The chairperson holds the rank of minister of state, and is a statutory member of the National Security Council. The chair is nominated by the Prime Minister of Japan and is appointed by the Emperor of Japan. The other five members of the commission must require the consent of both houses in the National Diet in order to serve.

The current Chairman is Satoshi Ninoyu, who took office in October 2021.

References